The Pella Cabinet was the 8th cabinet of the Italian Republic. It held office from 17 August 1953 to 18 January 1954, for a total of 154 days (or 5 months and 1 day). President Luigi Einaudi invited Giuseppe Pella to form an interim cabinet following the fall of the De Gasperi VIII Cabinet in a confidence vote, for the purpose of passing the budget.

Government parties
The Pella Cabinet was a one-party government, composed only of members of Christian Democracy (DC).

Composition

References

Italian governments
1953 establishments in Italy
1954 disestablishments in Italy
Cabinets established in 1953
Cabinets disestablished in 1954